The 34th Territorial Defense Battalion, is a Territorial Defense Battalion of Ukraine formed from volunteers of the "Resistance movement" (70%) and based in Kirovohrad Oblast and it is currently fighting in the War in Donbas. The unit was formed in June 2014 as part of the parties "Resistance movement" that it created because it felt Russia threatened Ukraine.

The battalion (claims to) have its own military intelligence and special operations forces.

On 1 August 2014, the battalion claimed it had destroyed the Luhansk People's Republic's Prizrak Battalion; this claim was false, and the Prizrak Battalion later participated in the Battle of Debaltseve.

It is fighting as part of the 57th Brigade in Bakhmut during the ongoing 2022 Russian invasion of Ukraine.

See also 

 Temporarily occupied and uncontrolled territories of Ukraine
 Ukrainian volunteer battalions (since 2014)

References

Territorial defence battalions of Ukraine
History of Kirovohrad Oblast
Military units and formations established in 2014
2014 establishments in Ukraine